Mary Lou Freeman ( Hawkinson; October 21, 1941 – September 4, 2006) was an American politician who served as a member of the Iowa House of Representatives and the Iowa State Senate.

Early life and career 
Born in Kandiyohi, Minnesota, Freeman, a Republican, was elected twice to the Iowa State Senate from the 5th District serving from 1995 to 2003, and was then elected to two terms in the Iowa State House from the 52nd district, serving from 2003 until her death in 2006.

Education 
Freeman graduated from Willmar High School and later obtained her Bachelor of Arts degree in elementary education from Gustavus Adolphus College.

Personal life and death

Family 
She married Dennis Freeman on June 10, 1962. Freeman was the daughter of J. Martin Hawkinson and Luella Hawkinson. She had 4 children and 10 grandchildren.
Freeman died at her home in Alta, Iowa on September 4, 2006.

Organizations 
Freeman was a member of the following organizations:
 Early Childhood Intervention Council; 1994
 State Board of Health; 1986–1994
 Maternal/Child Health Advisory Council; 1988–1994
 Medical Assistance Advisory Council; 1983–1985
 St. Mark Lutheran Church, Storm Lake

References 

1941 births
Gustavus Adolphus College alumni
Iowa state senators
Members of the Iowa House of Representatives
2006 deaths
Women state legislators in Iowa
People from Kandiyohi County, Minnesota
20th-century American politicians
20th-century American women politicians